Trox is a genus of hide beetle in the subfamily Troginae.

Taxonomy
In recent years, scientists have revamped the taxonomy of Trox. The formerly massive genus, which boasted a whopping 160 species, has been cut down. Specifically, the subgenera Phoberus and Glyptotrox have been reelevated as their own separate genera, while various Trox species have been merged or otherwise combined.

After taxonomic revisions, the genus Trox contains three subgenera - Trox (Trox), Trox (Niditrox), and Trox (Granulitrox) -, with the following species:

Subgenus Trox
Trox acanthinus Harold, 1872
Trox antiquus Wickham, 1909
Trox cadaverinus Illiger, 1802
Trox capillaris Say, 1824
Trox contractus Robinson, 1940
Trox coracinus Gmelin, 1788
Trox cretaceus Nikolajev, 2007
Trox floridanus Howden & Vaurie, 1957
Trox gansuensis Ren, 2003
Trox gemmulatus Horn, 1874
Trox horiguchii Ochi & Kawahara, 2002
Trox lama Pittino, 1985
Trox lutosus (Marsham, 1802)
Trox maurus Herbst, 1790
Trox minutus Nikolajev, 2008
Trox mitis Balthasar, 1933
Trox oustaleti Scudder, 1879
Trox placosalinus Ren, 2003
Trox plicatus Robinson, 1940
Trox robinsoni Vaurie, 1955
Trox sabulosus (Linnaeus, 1758)
Trox setifer Waterhouse, 1875
Trox sibericus Nikolajev, 2007
Trox sonorae LeConte, 1854
Trox sordidus LeConte, 1854
Trox stellatus Harold, 1872
Trox striatus Melsheimer, 1846
Trox torpidus Harold, 1872
Trox tuberculatus De Geer, 1774
Trox unistriatus Palisot de Beauvois, 1818
Trox ussuriensis Balthasar, 1931
Trox variolatus Melsheimer, 1846

Subgenus Niditrox
Trox aequalis Say, 1831
Trox affinis Robinson, 1940
Trox atrox LeConte, 1854
Trox eversmanni Krynicky, 1832
Trox fascifer LeConte, 1854
Trox koreanus Kim, 1991
Trox kyotensis Ochi & Kawahara, 2000
Trox laticollis LeConte, 1854
Trox nohirai Nakane, 1954
Trox perrisii Fairmaire, 1868
Trox scaber (Linnaeus, 1767)
Trox zoufali Balthasar, 1931

Subgenus Granulitrox
Trox aproximans Escalera, 1914
Trox clathratus Reiche, 1861
Trox confluens Wollaston, 1864
Trox cotodognanensis Compte, 1986
Trox cribrum Gené, 1836
Trox cyrenaicus Pittino, 2011
Trox elkantaraensis Pittino, 2011
Trox eximius Faldermann, 1835
Trox fabricii Reiche, 1853
Trox granulipennis Fairmaire, 1852
Trox hispanicus Harold, 1872
Trox hispidus (Pontoppidan, 1763)
Trox iranicus Petrovitz, 1980
Trox klapperichi Pittino, 1983
Trox leonardii Pittino, 1983
Trox litoralis Pittino, 1991
Trox martini Reitter, 1892
Trox mixtus Harold, 1872
Trox morticinii Pallas, 1781
Trox niger Rossi, 1792
Trox nodulosus Harold, 1872
Trox perlatus Geoffroy, 1762
Trox quadrimaculatus Ballion, 1870
Trox sordidatus Balthasar, 1936
Trox strandi Balthasar, 1936
Trox transversus Reiche, 1856

Incertae sedis
Trox cricetulus Ádám, 1994

References

Trogidae
Scarabaeoidea genera
Taxa named by Johan Christian Fabricius